Kathryn Elise Hoff (born June 3, 1989) is a former American competitive swimmer, she is an Olympic medalist, and former world record-holder. Hoff was known for her success in the 200-meter and 400-meter individual medley. She represented the United States at the 2004 Summer Olympics and 2008 Summer Olympics, in which she was awarded a silver medal and two bronze medals.

Competitive career

2004–2005

Hoff qualified for the 2004 Summer Olympics at the age of 15; she failed to medal in both of the events in which she competed.

At the 2005 World Aquatics Championships, Hoff set a championships record for her time of 2:10.41 in the women's 200 m individual medley. Hoff received two more gold medals at the competition, one in the 400-meter medley and the other for the 4×200-meter freestyle, with teammates Natalie Coughlin, Whitney Myers, and Kaitlin Sandeno.

2006
Hoff made news early in the year by signing a 10-year endorsement deal with Speedo, which was the longest deal Speedo had with any athlete at the time (including Phelps). As a result, Hoff forfeited her amateur status for purposes of NCAA rules; however, one of the terms of the deal included a clause that Speedo would pay the cost of her college tuition.

2007 World Aquatics Championships

Hoff retained her 200-meter individual medley title by winning at the 2007 World Championships setting a new championship record of 2:10.13. Hoff's previous experience helped her use her "veteran" status to help the most experienced member of the U.S. team, Natalie Coughlin, prepare for their world-record-setting pace in the 4×200-meter freestyle relay.

2008 Summer Olympics

Heading into the 2008 Olympics, Hoff was considered a strong contender. Hoff held the American record in the 200-meter individual medley at 2:09.71 and set the world record in the 400-meter individual medley with a time of 4:31.12 set at the 2008 U.S. swim trials. (This time was subsequently bettered by Stephanie Rice in the Olympic finals with a time of 4:29.45).

Hoff's performances in Beijing produced a decidedly mixed record. NBC commentator and former-Olympian Rowdy Gaines described her results as disappointing (this included finishing second to Great Britain's Rebecca Adlington in the 400-meter freestyle), yet noted that her three medals at one Olympics is a significant achievement and cited the depth of the field in each of her events. Prior to the Olympic Games, Hoff was saddled by the media with the label "the female Michael Phelps" due to the challenging slate of races in which she was competing. Bob Bowman, Phelps' coach, thought the comparison was unfair.

Hoff set the American record in the 200-meter freestyle, yet finished fourth in the event; 70 minutes later in the finals of the 200-meter individual medley Hoff again finished fourth, well behind her time at the U.S. swim trials. These results led to questions as to whether Hoff's program in Beijing was too aggressive.  It was also suggested that Hoff's narrow miss of a gold medal in the 400-meter freestyle created a confidence issue that affected her later races. Following her consecutive fourth-place finishes, Hoff's coach, Paul Yetter, held that she was having a good meet and denied she had peaked too early. Yetter also predicted that Hoff could have an "awesome" 800-meter freestyle race to conclude her second Olympic games. However, Hoff dramatically faded over the second half of her preliminary race, finishing in 8:27.78, 8.08 seconds off her personal best time, and failed to advance.

2009
Hoff's plan for 2009 had been to train at Loyola College in Chicago, where it was reported she would enroll in classes and volunteer as an assistant swim coach, similar to what Michael Phelps had done at the University of Michigan. However, ESPN reported that she would instead remain at NBAC and switch coaches to work with Bob Bowman, who had announced in April 2008 that he was leaving Michigan's program after the Olympic trials. Bowman's coaching style did not mesh well with Hoff, and her time working with him ended in May 2009, when she came close to quitting the sport.

Hoff did not qualify for the 2009 World Aquatics Championships after an 8th-place finish in the 200-meter freestyle and a 6th-place finish in the 400-meter freestyle at the U.S. National Championships.  Hoff subsequently withdrew from the 100- and 800-meter freestyle races, ending her chances of making the team.

2010
Hoff relocated to California, where she began training and competing with the Fullerton Aquatics Sports Team (FAST) and coach Sean Hutchison. She began to return to form, and at the 2010 USA Swimming Championships, she won a gold and 2 bronze medals.

2011 World Aquatics Championships

At the 2011 World Aquatics Championships in Shanghai, China, Hoff won a gold medal in the 4×200-meter freestyle relay with Missy Franklin, Dagny Knutson, and Allison Schmitt, with the team finishing ahead of Australia and China.  As the third leg, Hoff had a 1:57.41 split.

2012
Hoff moved to Naples, Florida to train with T2 Aquatics under her former coach Paul Yetter, who had moved there from NBAC in 2010.

At the 2012 Olympic Trials, Hoff failed to qualify for her third Olympics, finishing 20th in the preliminary runs in the 200-meter and 400-meter freestyle and 13th in the 800-meter freestyle.

2013

Beginning in 2013, Hoff took a brief hiatus from competitive swimming focus on her studies, enrolling at the University of Miami as a full-time student. However, she began training with Hurricane Aquatics club team (as a professional, she could not swim in the NCAA) at the University of Miami shortly after arriving there.  Hoff competed in her first meet since the 2012 Olympic Trials on November 23–24.

2014

In April 2014, Hoff made a comeback at the Mesa Arena Pro Series. At Nationals in Irvine, California, she was forced to withdraw due to health problems. In October it was found that she had blood clots in her lungs, which took her several months to recover from.

2015

On December 14, 2015, Hoff officially announced her retirement from swimming due to continuing health issues related to scar tissue from blood clots in her lungs.

Personal life

Hoff was born in Palo Alto, California and lived for a number of years in Williamsburg, Virginia, where she swam as a youngster with the Williamsburg Aquatic Club, coached by Harold Baker. She also swam summer neighborhood meets with the Windsor Forest Frogs, where several of her team records, circa 2000 and 2001 still stand. She moved with her family to Towson, Maryland in 2003, in part so she could practice with the North Baltimore Aquatic Club, also the home team of Michael Phelps. In 2008, she purchased a condominium in the Mount Washington neighborhood of Baltimore. Her mother, Jeanne Ruark Hoff, played basketball for Stanford University from 1979 to 1983. Hoff's father, John, is a salesman. Both Hoff and her younger brother, Christian, were home schooled. She is married to former Michigan State football player Todd Anderson. In December 2015, she announced her retirement from swimming.

Major achievements

International events

U.S. National Achievements

See also

 List of Olympic medalists in swimming (women)
 List of World Aquatics Championships medalists in swimming (women)
 World record progression 400 metres individual medley
 World record progression 4 × 200 metres freestyle relay

Bibliography
 Hoff, Katie with Richard Bader. Blueprint: An Olympian's Story of Striving, Adapting, and Embracing the Suck. United States, CG Sports Publishing, October 23, 2020. .

References

External links

 
 
 
 
 Video of Katie Hoff swimming who demonstrates strong exhalation during her Beijing 400m silver medal swim. swimsmooth.com

1989 births
Living people
American female freestyle swimmers
American female medley swimmers
World record setters in swimming
Loyola University Maryland alumni
Medalists at the FINA World Swimming Championships (25 m)
Medalists at the 2008 Summer Olympics
Olympic bronze medalists for the United States in swimming
Olympic silver medalists for the United States in swimming
Sportspeople from Palo Alto, California
People from Towson, Maryland
Sportspeople from Baltimore County, Maryland
Swimmers at the 2004 Summer Olympics
Swimmers at the 2008 Summer Olympics
World Aquatics Championships medalists in swimming
21st-century American women